Mastax saganicola is a species of beetle in the family Carabidae with restricted distribution in the Ethiopia.

References

Endemic fauna of Ethiopia
Mastax saganicola
Beetles of Africa
Beetles described in 1942